The 2009–10 season was the 96th season in the existence of Stade Malherbe Caen and the club's first season back in the second division of French football. In addition to the domestic league, Caen participated in this season's editions of the Coupe de France and Coupe de la Ligue.

Pre-season and friendlies

Competitions

Overall record

Ligue 2

League table

Results summary

Results by round

Matches
The league fixtures were announced on 5 June 2009.

Coupe de France

Coupe de la Ligue

Statistics

Appearances and goals

Goalscorers

References

Stade Malherbe Caen seasons
Caen